Kalasapakkam is a town  on the river bed of Cheyyar River and the headquarters of Kalasapakkam taluk in Tiruvannamalai district, Tamil Nadu, India. It has a population of 47,210 according to 2011 census. It has an area of 532 KM^2. It is one of the oldest towns of North Arcot District. Now the town is replaced by large-scale industries.

Geography

Kalasapakkam taluk
Kalasapakkam taluk has 45 village Panchayats. The Details of 45 Village Panchayats in Kalasapakkam Panchayat Union. 
Venkatampalayam, Veeralur, Vanniyanur, Thenpallipattu, Thenmagadevamangalam, Siruvallur, Singaravadi, Cholavaram, Sengaputheri, Cheetambattu, Poondi, Pillur, Pattiyanthal, Pathiyavadi, Pazhankovil, Padakam, Mottur, Melvilvarayanallur, Melpalur, Melarani, Melchozhankuppam, Mattavettu, Ladavaram, Kovilmadhimangalam, Keezhpothirai, Kilpalur, Kilkuppam, Kitampalaiyam, Kettavarampalaiyam, Kappalur, Kanthapalaiyam, Kampattu, Kaalur, Kalasapakkam, Kadaladi, Gangavaram, Kenkalamakatevi, Ernamangalam, Elathur, Thevarayanpalaiyam, Arunagirimankalam, Aniyalai, Anaivadi, Alangaramangalam, Aadhamangalam.

See also
Kadaladi

References

External links
 Satellite image of Kalasapakkam
 Website of Kalasapakkam

Cities and towns in Tiruvannamalai district